KDEX (1590 AM) is a radio station broadcasting a country music format, licensed in Dexter, Missouri, United States. The station is currently owned by Palmer Johnson, through licensee KDEX Inc.

In December 2020, Joeli Barbour's Dexter Broadcasting reached an agreement to sell KDEX-AM and KDEX-FM to Palmer Johnson, a Contract Broadcast Engineer from Kennett, MO. On August 30, 2021 KDEX was transferred to KDEX Inc, a corporation 100 percent owned by Palmer Johnson. KDEX Inc immediately changed the format of KDEX-AM to a Classic Hits format. KDEX-AM had been a 100 percent simulcast of co-owned KDEX-FM.

References

External links
KDEX Twitter Page

Country radio stations in the United States
DEX (AM)
Radio stations established in 1956
DEX (AM)